Combo 66 a studio album by American jazz musician John Scofield. The album was released on 28 September 2018 by Verve label. The “66” in the album title refers to Scofield's age at the time of recording. The combo themselves include keyboardist Gerald Clayton, bassist Vicente Archer and longtime Scofield drummer Bill Stewart.

Reception
Jeff Tamarkin writing for Relix stated, "Scofield prefers clean lines, a marked swing (even notably present in the ballads) to push his melodies ahead and an uncluttered accompaniment that allows his leads to stand out without entirely dominating the proceedings. It’s a formula that has made Scofield one of the most popular artists in contemporary jazz." Bill Meredith in his review for JazzTimes noted, "Combo 66 may be named for Scofield’s age, but it sounds as timeless as he does ageless." Will Layman of PopMatters stated, "John Scofield makes this kind of album-length delight seem tossed-off, casual, easy-as-pie. He wrote each appealing theme, and his worn-in guitar tone dominates every track like the voice of a favorite actor—his guitar sound is arguably the Morgan Freeman of jazz- wise and great to hear, never tiring but never dull." Chris Pearson of The Times added, "Don’t expect a nostalgic wallow, though. Sco’s electric guitar is as fuzzy as ever and all the tunes are originals. This is modern music."

Track listing

Personnel
John Scofield – guitar
Gerald Clayton – piano, organ
Bill Stewart – drums
Vicente Archer – bass
Jay Newland - record and mix engineer

References 

2018 albums
John Scofield albums
Verve Records albums